The Vanuatu passport is an international travel document that is issued to Vanuatu citizens.

Basic appearance
Ordinary passports have green covers. According to law, the passport is required to show on its cover the coat of arms of Vanuatu as well as the text "Republic of Vanuatu" and "Passport" in both English and French (the two official languages). Inside, the following bilingual text appears:

The President of the Republic of Vanuatu requests and requires in the name of the Republic all those whom it may concern to allow the bearer peacefully to pass without let or hindrance and to afford the bearer such assistance and protection as may be necessary.

Au nom de la Nation, le Président de la République de Vanuatu prie instamment toutes les autorités compétentes de bien vouloir laisser passer librement le titulaire du présent passeport et de lui offrir assistance et protection le cas échéant.

As late as 2010, Vanuatu passports were still hand-written, presenting the possibility of crime and fraud in their use; New Zealand pledged to use part of its NZ$19 million foreign aid to Vanuatu that year to assist the country in moving to a fully electronic system. The new passports were planned to begin production in December 2010; they would include biometric data, and be manufactured by a German company. The first new biometric passports were issued ahead of schedule in September 2010, to acting minister for internal affairs Paul Telukluk, two twin boys, and a migrant labourer planning to work abroad under a Recognised Seasonal Employer scheme. Telukluk expressed hopes that the new passports would meet international requirements and expand the list of jurisdictions which allowed visa-free entry for Vanuatu citizens.

With the new biometric passports being available, Henri Tamashiro of the passports office stated in late September 2010 that his office planned to cancel all old diplomatic passports within a month.

Visa requirements

, Vanuatuan citizens had visa-free or visa on arrival access to 130 countries and territories, ranking the Vanuatuan passport 42nd in terms of travel freedom according to the Henley visa restrictions index. Vanuatu signed a mutual visa waiver agreement with Schengen Area countries on 28 May 2015. A mutual visa waiver agreement was signed with Russia on 20 September 2016 and entered into force on 21 October 2016.

Legal authority for issuance
Act 3 of 1987 (CAP 108) describes the legal framework for the issuance of ordinary passports. The law requires the Principal Passport Officer to issue passports to all citizens of Vanuatu who apply, as long as he or she is satisfied with the evidence of citizenship that the applicant presents. Under Subsection 12, passports may be confiscated in accordance with emergency regulations declared under Article 69 of the Constitution of Vanuatu, or pursuant to a court order against a person who has been granted bail, remanded in custody or sentenced to a term of imprisonment or a fine.

The Citizenship Act has been amended once in 2013 and twice in 2014. More insights on the amendments are provided by the attachments under Legislative Framework.
Interestingly, as per the amendments Vanuatu now recognises dual citizenship. This practically means that a citizen of Vanuatu or of a state of other than Vanuatu may be granted dual citizenship.  recognition of dual citizenship

According to Act 30 of 1984 (CAP 179), the minister of foreign affairs may issue diplomatic passports to:
The President of Vanuatu
The Prime Minister of Vanuatu
The Speaker of the Parliament of Vanuatu
Government ministers of Vanuatu
Ambassadors of Vanuatu
High commissioners of Vanuatu
Personnel of Vanuatu's ministry of foreign affairs (diplomatic and consular staff)
Leader of a delegation or sole Vanuatu representative at international conference or bilateral or multilateral negotiations
Diplomatic couriers

According to the same act, the minister of foreign affairs may issue official passports to:
Members of the parliament of Vanuatu
The chief justice of Vanuatu
The attorney general of Vanuatu
Judges of the supreme court of Vanuatu
Solicitor-general magistrates of Vanuatu
The Commissioner of Police Ombudsman
Chairman of the National Council of Chiefs
Officers of the Vanuatu government and parliament

Additionally, the spouses of anyone travelling on a diplomatic or official passport may also be granted the same type of passport, provided they are travelling on duty at the expense of the government of Vanuatu. Finally, the minister of foreign affairs has the authority to grant diplomatic or official passports to any person in respect of whom he or she considers exceptional circumstances apply.

Beginning in 2010, the Ministry of Foreign Affairs no longer directly issues diplomatic passports; instead, the ministry makes a recommendation to the immigration department, wherein the passports office is responsible for issuance. For renunciation of nationality, the Government of Vanuatu will not issue a certificate of renunciation. The citizen may renounce the nationality at any time.

Illegal issuance
Along with other South Pacific island nations, Vanuatu has been accused of selling its passports for cash, primarily to people from Asia; Marie Noelle-Peterson of the Vanuatu Office of the Ombudsman in particular has repeatedly condemned successive Vanuatu governments for this practise, as well as for their handling of the money earned thereby. For example, in the period 1996–1997, roughly 300 Vanuatu passports are believed to have been sold under "passports-for-cash" programmes. Unlike in Tonga, the Marshall Islands, or Nauru, there is no legal basis for such programmes under Vanuatu law.

In 1994, two Australian real estate developers presented schemes to the Vanuatu government involving the sale of Vanuatu passports to investors. In the first, real estate developer John Avram and his Melbourne-based associates suggested developing an offshore financial centre on Moso Island with its own bank, casino, companies registrar, financial markets, and through it to offer Vanuatu residency and citizenship to business investors. The scheme was approved but never came to fruition. Later in the same year, the Olilian group proposed attracting roughly 3,000 wealthy Asian investors by establishing an offshore financial centre and free trade zone with commercial, hotel, medical, and residential facilities at Luganville on the island of Espiritu Santo and offering Vanuatu passports to investors. However, the promoters were charged with fraud the following year, and the scheme failed.

In March 1997, Richard Jae-yong Jung, a South Korean national with an earlier criminal conviction for sale of military goods as well as outstanding charges of securities counterfeiting in his home country, approached then-Prime Minister Serge Vohor, Finance Minister Willie Jimmy, and later Foreign Minister Vital Soksok to propose a "passports-for-cash" scheme whereby his company Resort Las Vegas would build a 350-room, US$100 million hotel, and grant investors in the hotel Vanuatu permanent residency and passports, for a suggested price of 700,000 vatu each. Jong was granted honorary citizenship of Vanuatu on April 29, and received an ordinary Vanuatu passport on May 5. In September that year, he was appointed Vanuatu Trade Commissioner to South Korea, and also received an official passport. The Vanuatu Office of the Ombudsman found that Soksok and Vohor had "acted in a grossly incompetent and naive manner" and suggested they resign, and also proposed a number of changes to the passport issuance system.

In 2007, Vanuatu minister of foreign affairs George Wells announced that his ministry would cancel forty previously issued diplomatic passports out of a total of 248 outstanding, in an effort to impose tighter controls on their future use. However, there continued to be concern that officials were illegally selling Vanuatu passports. A further forty diplomatic passports were cancelled in 2009 by minister Joe Natuman, following reports that European countries had expressed concern over their misuse. Prime minister Edward Natapei even commented in a Radio New Zealand interview that he had been delayed by customs officials in various countries while they checked that his country existed, that he was really its prime minister, and that his diplomatic passport was valid. In November 2010, Alex Chung, Vanuatu's former honorary consul to Singapore, was arrested for illegal possession of a diplomatic passport. The Passport Act of 2009 further tightened the requirements for diplomatic passports, and granted sole authority for their issuance to a newly formed Passport Services body. Nevertheless, in late 2010, a local newspaper reported that the number of foreigners holding Vanuatu diplomatic passports was still higher than the number of Vanuatu citizens holding the same.

In late 2009, a scandal arose over the issuance of a Vanuatu passport to Amarendra Nath Ghosh. Ghosh was Vanuatu's erstwhile honorary consul in Thailand. In addition to the diplomatic passport to which his position entitled him, Ghosh had also managed to obtain an ordinary Vanuatu passport, a privilege legally restricted to Vanuatu citizens. Ghosh had never applied for naturalisation as a Vanuatu citizen, but had honorary citizenship in connection with his position. In early January 2010, Citizenship Commission head Joemelson Joseph wrote to Immigration Department principal passport officer Henri Tamashiro to advise him that Ghosh had not forfeited his Vanuatu passport, implying that the passport should be renewed; Joseph's handling of the matter led to condemnation from the prime minister. Ghosh claimed to be trapped in India due to his lack of a travel document, and in late January 2010 threatened to sue the Vanuatu government. However, the Citizenship Commission held an emergency meeting at which the affirmed that Ghosh was not a Vanuatu citizen and thus not entitled to renewal of his passport. Joseph was absent from the meeting.

Capital Investment Immigration Plan (CIIP)
The CIIP was initially proposed by Vanuatu Registry Services Limited (Deputy Commissioner of the Vanuatu Financial Services Commission) in early 2012 and fully adopted by the Government of Vanuatu in April 2014. The objective of the plan is to create local jobs, stimulate the economy and keep the national budget balanced. The citizenship is for life, and does not require visiting Vanuatu.

To facilitate and attract overseas investors, Vanuatu has passed and enacted all necessary legislation and regulations, changing its constitution to recognise dual citizenship, which was not recognised until the constitution was changed by a two-thirds majority of Parliament in December 2012.

CIIP is managed exclusively by VRS and is marketed and sold by a wide group of carefully selected agents. Since the programme started running, Vanuatu has continued to offer citizenship to those who are qualified and who have donated a significant amount of capital into their economy. Vanuatu provides citizenship for 260,000 US dollars per person which is under the CIIP. Such citizens do not have a right to vote or run for public office.

Vanuatu Economic Rehabilitation Program (VERP)

The citizenships being provided under the VERP Program are part of a fast track citizenship program which is totally legal and follows an approved and legislated process. Several successful applicants have been approved and received their Citizenship Certificates as well as passports already. It is a cooperative program that involves the Vanuatu Citizenship Commission, the Immigration Department, the State Law Office, Finance Intelligence Unit, the Vanuatu Investment Promotion Authority, the Vanuatu Financial Services Commission (in the case of formation of companies), the Ministry of Internal Affairs and the Prime Minister's Office as the Minister responsible for Citizenship.

This process allows for checks and balances as well as internal transparency so that when an applicant  is successful with his or her application, he/she receives his/her Citizenship Certificate very quickly as well as a new Vanuatu passport.

The Citizenship Commission has appointed three designated agents to promote the VERP citizenship Program worldwide given them exclusivity over some regions. Designated agents are: Vanuatu Rehabilitation Program - MENA Region (s.a.r.l) for the Middle East and North Africa, PRG for China and Russia, Haven Vanuatu for Europe and the Americas.

The continuity of  the Vanuatu Economic Rehabilitation Program (VERP) is currently under review by the Vanuatu Government as indicated in its 100-day plan, from the Prime Minister's Office and is expected to cease operations by June 2016.

See Vanuatu Government 100 Day Plan.

See also
Visa requirements for Vanuatuan citizens

References

Vanuatu
Passport